PAMS is a U.S. jingle-production company.

Pams may also refer to:

 Pams (company), a New Zealand company in the food industry
 PAMs, Pneumatic artificial muscles
 Proceedings of the American Mathematical Society, a journal